Rahm Israel Emanuel (born November 29, 1959) is an American politician and diplomat who is the current United States ambassador to Japan. A member of the Democratic Party, he served three terms representing Illinois in the United States House of Representatives from 2003 to 2009 and as White House Chief of Staff from 2009 to 2010 under Barack Obama, before serving two terms as the 55th mayor of Chicago from 2011 to 2019.

Born in Chicago, Emanuel is a graduate of Sarah Lawrence College and Northwestern University. Early in his career, Emanuel served as director of the finance committee for Bill Clinton's 1992 presidential campaign. In 1993, he joined the Clinton administration, where he served as assistant to the president for political affairs and as Senior Advisor to the President for policy and strategy. Emanuel worked at the investment bank Wasserstein Perella & Co. from 1998 for two and a half years and served on the board of directors of Freddie Mac. In 2002, Emanuel ran for the seat in the U.S. House of Representatives vacated by Rod Blagojevich, who resigned to become governor of Illinois. Emanuel won the first of three terms representing Illinois's 5th congressional district, a seat he held from 2003 to 2009. As chair of the Democratic Congressional Campaign Committee, he oversaw Democratic wins in the 2006 United States House of Representatives elections, allowing the party to gain control of the chamber for the first time since 1994.

After the 2008 U.S. presidential election, President Barack Obama appointed Emanuel to serve as White House chief of staff. In October 2010, Emanuel resigned as chief of staff to run in the 2011 Chicago mayoral election. Emanuel won with 55% of the vote over five other candidates in the non-partisan mayoral election. In the 2015 Chicago mayoral election, he failed to obtain an absolute majority in the first round but defeated Cook County board commissioner Jesús "Chuy" García in the subsequent run-off election. In late 2015, Emanuel's approval rating plunged to "the low 20s", in response to a series of scandals.

In October 2017, Emanuel announced he planned to run for a third term, but he reversed his decision on September 4, 2018. The Chicago Tribune assessed Emanuel's performance as mayor as "mixed", and at one point half of Chicagoans favored Emanuel's resignation. He left office in May 2019 and was succeeded by Lori Lightfoot. In August 2021, President Joe Biden nominated Emanuel to be the United States Ambassador to Japan; he was confirmed by the U.S. Senate in December of that year.

Early life and family
Emanuel's paternal grandfather was a Moldovan Jew who emigrated from Bessarabia. The surname Emanuel, which means "God is with us", was adopted by their family in honor of Rahm's uncle (his father's brother) Emanuel Auerbach, who was killed in 1933 in an altercation with Arabs in Jerusalem.

Emanuel's father, Benjamin M. Emanuel, was a Jerusalem-born pediatrician at Michael Reese Hospital who was once a member of the Irgun, a Jewish paramilitary organization that operated in Mandatory Palestine. His mother, Marsha (née Smulevitz), is the daughter of a West Side Chicago labor union organizer who worked in the civil rights movement. She briefly owned a local rock and roll club, and later became an adherent of Benjamin Spock's writings. Emanuel's parents met during the 1950s in Chicago.

Emanuel was born on November 29, 1959, in Chicago, Illinois. His first name, Rahm means high or lofty in Hebrew. He attended Bernard Zell Anshe Emet Day School in Lakeview for elementary school. He has been described by his older brother Ezekiel, an oncologist and bioethicist at the University of Pennsylvania, as "quiet and observant" as a child. Ari, his younger brother, is the CEO of Endeavor, an entertainment agency with headquarters in Beverly Hills, California. Rahm Emanuel also has a younger adopted sister, Shoshana.

Education and ballet dance
While he lived in Chicago, Emanuel attended the Bernard Zell Anshe Emet Day School. After his family moved to Wilmette, north of the city, Emanuel attended public schools: Romona School, Locust Junior High School, and New Trier High School. He and his brothers attended summer camp in Israel, including the summer following the June 1967 Six-Day War. Ezekiel has written that their father "did not believe in falsely building his sons' self-esteem by purposefully letting us win, or tolerating sloppy play". About Rahm, he also wrote:

Rahm was encouraged by his mother to take ballet lessons, and is a graduate of the Evanston School of Ballet, as well as a student of The Joel Hall Dance Center, where his children later took lessons. He won a scholarship to the Joffrey Ballet, but turned it down to attend Sarah Lawrence College, a liberal arts school with a strong dance program. This background, as well as the mayor's short stature, has led critics of the Mayor to nickname him "tiny dancer". While an undergraduate, Emanuel was elected to the Sarah Lawrence Student Senate. He graduated from Sarah Lawrence in 1981 with a Bachelor of Arts in Liberal Arts, and went on to receive a Master of Arts in Speech and Communication from Northwestern University in 1985.

Emanuel took part in a two-week civilian volunteer holiday, known as the Sar-El, where, as a civilian volunteer, he assisted the Israel Defense Forces during the 1991 Gulf War, helping to repair truck brakes in one of Israel's northern bases.

While a high school student working part-time at an Arby's restaurant, Emanuel severely cut his right middle finger on a meat slicer, which was later infected from swimming in Lake Michigan. His finger was partially amputated due to the severity of the infection.

Political staffer career
Emanuel began his political career with the public interest and consumer rights organization Illinois Public Action. He went on to serve in a number of capacities in local and national politics, initially specializing in fund-raising for Illinois campaigns, and then nationally.

Emanuel worked for Democrat Paul Simon's 1984 election to the U.S. Senate. He also worked as the national campaign director for the Democratic Congressional Campaign Committee in 1988, and was senior advisor and chief fund-raiser for Richard M. Daley's successful initial campaign for mayor of Chicago, in 1989.

At the start of then-Arkansas Governor Bill Clinton's presidential primary campaign, Emanuel was appointed to direct the campaign's finance committee. Emanuel insisted that Clinton schedule time for fund-raising and delay campaigning in New Hampshire. Clinton embarked on an aggressive national fund-raising campaign that allowed the campaign to keep buying television time as attacks on Clinton's character threatened to swamp the campaign during the New Hampshire primary. Clinton's primary rival, Paul Tsongas (the New Hampshire Democratic primary winner), later withdrew, citing a lack of campaign funds. Richard Mintz, a Washington public relations consultant who worked with Emanuel on the campaign, spoke about the soundness of the idea: "It was that [extra] million dollars that really allowed the campaign to withstand the storm we had to ride out in New Hampshire [over Clinton's relationship with Gennifer Flowers and the controversy over his draft status during the Vietnam War]." Emanuel's knowledge of the top donors in the country, and his rapport with "heavily Jewish" donors helped Clinton amass a then-unheard-of sum of $72 million. While working on the Clinton campaign Emanuel was a paid retainer of the investment bank Goldman Sachs.

Clinton administration 
Following the campaign, Emanuel served as a senior advisor to Clinton at the White House from 1993 to 1998. In the White House, Emanuel was initially Assistant to the President for Political Affairs and then Senior Advisor to the President for Policy and Strategy. He was a leading strategist in White House efforts to institute NAFTA, among other Clinton initiatives.

Emanuel is known for his "take-no-prisoners style" that has earned him the nickname "Rahmbo". Emanuel sent a dead fish in a box to a pollster who was late delivering polling results. On the night after the 1992 election, angry at Democrats and Republicans who "betrayed" them in the 1992 election, Emanuel stood up at a celebratory dinner with colleagues from the campaign and began plunging a steak knife into the table and began rattling off names while shouting "Dead! Dead! Dead!". Before Tony Blair gave a pro-Clinton speech during the impeachment crisis, Emanuel reportedly screamed at Blair "Don't fuck this up!" while Clinton was present. Blair and Clinton both burst into laughter. However, by 2007 friends of Emanuel were saying that he has "mellowed out". Stories of his personal style have entered the popular culture, inspiring articles and websites that chronicle these and other quotes and incidents. The character Josh Lyman in The West Wing was said to be based on Emanuel, though executive producer Lawrence O'Donnell denied this.

Career in finance
After serving as an advisor to Bill Clinton, in 1998 Emanuel resigned from his position in the administration and joined the investment banking firm Wasserstein Perella, where he worked for  years. Although he did not have an MBA degree or prior banking experience, he became a managing director at the firm's Chicago office in 1999, and according to congressional disclosures, made $16.2 million in his  years as a banker. At Wasserstein Perella, he worked on eight deals, including the acquisition by Commonwealth Edison of Peco Energy and the purchase by GTCR Golder Rauner of the SecurityLink home security unit from SBC Communications.

Freddie Mac
In 2000, Emanuel was named to the Board of Directors of Freddie Mac by President Clinton. He earned at least $320,000 during his time there, including later stock sales. During Emanuel's time on the board, Freddie Mac was plagued with scandals involving campaign contributions and accounting irregularities. The Bush administration rejected a request under the Freedom of Information Act to review Freddie Mac board minutes and correspondence during Emanuel's time as a director. The Office of Federal Housing Enterprise Oversight later accused the board of having "failed in its duty to follow up on matters brought to its attention". Emanuel resigned from the board in 2001 before his first bid for Congress.

Congressional career

Elections
In 2002, Emanuel pursued the U.S. House seat in the 5th district of Illinois, previously held by Rod Blagojevich, who successfully ran for governor of Illinois. His strongest opponent in the crowded primary of eight was former Illinois state representative Nancy Kaszak. During the primary, Edward Moskal, president of the Polish American Congress, a political action committee endorsing Kaszak, called Emanuel a "millionaire carpetbagger". Emanuel won the primary and defeated Republican candidate Mark Augusti in the general election. Emanuel's inaugural election to the House was the closest he ever had, as he won more than 70% of the vote in all of his re-election bids.

Tenure

Emanuel was elected after the October 2002 joint resolution authorizing the Iraq War, and so did not vote on it. However, in the lead up to the resolution, Emanuel spoke out in support of the war.

In January 2003, Emanuel was named to the House Financial Services Committee and sat on the subcommittee that oversaw Freddie Mac. A few months later, Freddie Mac Chief Executive Officer Leland Brendsel was forced out and the committee and subcommittee commenced more than a year of hearings into Freddie Mac. Emanuel skipped every hearing allegedly for reasons of avoiding any appearance of favoritism, impropriety, or conflict of interest.

Emanuel aligned himself with the Democratic Leadership Council.

Democratic Congressional Campaign Committee chairman
Emanuel assumed the position of Democratic Congressional Campaign Committee chairman (DCCC) after the death of the previous chair, Bob Matsui. Emanuel led the Democratic Party's effort to capture the majority in the House of Representatives in the 2006 elections. The documentary HouseQuake, featuring Emanuel, chronicles those elections. Emanuel had disagreements over Democratic election strategy with Democratic National Committee Chairman Howard Dean. Dean favored a "fifty-state strategy", building support for the Democratic Party over the long term, while Emanuel advocated a more tactical approach focusing attention on key districts.

The Democratic Party gained 30 seats in the House in the 2006 elections, and Emanuel received considerable praise for his stewardship of the DCCC, even from Illinois Republican Rep. Ray LaHood, who said, "He legitimately can be called the golden boy of the Democratic Party today. He recruited the right candidates, found the money, and funded them, and provided issues for them. Rahm did what no one else could do in seven cycles."

However, Emanuel also faced some criticism for his failure to support some progressive candidates, as Howard Dean advocated. Emanuel had "aggressively recruited right-leaning candidates, frequently military veterans, including former Republicans". Many of the Representatives that Rahm had recruited, such as Heath Shuler, ended up "[voting] against important Obama administration priorities, like economic stimulus, banking reform, and health care". Howie Klein has suggested that Emanuel's congressional campaign strategy was short-sighted, as it "contributed to the massive G.O.P. majorities we have now, the biggest since the nineteen-twenties" when the Democrats lost control of the House in the 2010 mid-term elections.

After Emanuel's election as chairman of the Democratic Caucus (see below), Chris Van Hollen became committee chair for the 110th Congress.

Democratic Caucus chairman
After his role in helping the Democrats win the 2006 elections, Emanuel was believed to be a leading candidate for the position of Majority Whip. Nancy Pelosi, who became the next Speaker of the House of Representatives, persuaded him not to challenge Jim Clyburn, but instead to succeed Clyburn in the role of Democratic Caucus Chairman. In return, Pelosi agreed to assign the caucus chair more responsibilities, including "aspects of strategy and messaging, incumbent retention, policy development, and rapid-response communications". Caucus vice-chair John Larson remained in his role instead of running for the chairman position.

After Vice President Dick Cheney asserted that he did not fall within the bounds of orders set for the executive branch, Emanuel called for cutting off the $4.8 million the Executive Branch provides for the Vice President's office.

Positions on political issues

Social issues
Emanuel is generally liberal on social issues. He has maintained a 100-percent pro-choice voting record, supports LGBT rights including same-sex marriage, and is a strong supporter of gun control, rated "F" by the NRA in December 2003. He has also strongly supported the banning of numerous rifles based upon "sporting purposes" criteria.

During his original 2002 campaign, Emanuel spoke in support of the goal of "to help make health care affordable and available for all Americans".

In his 2006 book, co-authored with Bruce Reed, The Plan: Big Ideas for America, Emanuel advocated a three-month compulsory universal service program for Americans between the ages of 18 and 25. A similar, expanded version of the initiative was later proposed by Barack Obama during his 2008 presidential campaign.

Iraq war
During his original 2002 campaign, Emanuel "indicated his support of President Bush's position on Iraq, but said he believed the President needed to better articulate his position to the American people".

In the 2006 congressional primaries, Emanuel, then head of the Democratic congressional campaign committee, helped organize a run by Tammy Duckworth, an Iraq war veteran with no political experience, against grassroots candidate Christine Cegelis in Illinois' 6th district. Expedited withdrawal from Iraq was a central point of Cegelis' campaign and Duckworth opposed a withdrawal timetable.

Middle East
In June 2007, Emanuel condemned an outbreak of Palestinian violence in the Gaza Strip and criticized Arab countries for not applying the same kind of pressure on the Palestinians as they have on Israel. At a 2003 pro-Israel rally in Chicago, Emanuel told the marchers that Israel was "ready for peace" but would not get there until Palestinians "turn away from the path of terror".

White House Chief of Staff
Emanuel declared in April 2006 that he would support Hillary Clinton should she pursue the presidency in 2008. Emanuel remained close to Clinton since leaving the White House, talking strategy with her at least once a month as chairman of the DCCC. However, Emanuel's loyalties came into conflict when his home-state Senator, Barack Obama, expressed interest in the race. Asked in January 2007, about his stance on the Democratic presidential nomination, he said: "I'm hiding under the desk. I'm very far under the desk, and I'm bringing my paper and my phone." Emanuel remained neutral in the race until June 4, 2008, the day after the final primary contests, when he endorsed Obama.

On November 6, 2008, Emanuel accepted the position of White House Chief of Staff for US President Barack Obama. He resigned his congressional seat effective January 2, 2009. A special primary to fill his vacated congressional seat was held on March 3, 2009, and the special general election on April 7. John Fritchey, a candidate for that seat, said at a forum that Emanuel had told him he may be interested in running for the seat again in the future.

Some Republican leaders criticized Emanuel's appointment because they believed it went against Obama's campaign promises of less divisive politics, given Emanuel's reputation as a partisan Democrat. Republican Senator Lindsey Graham disagreed, saying: "This is a wise choice by President-elect Obama. He's tough, but fair, honest, direct, and candid." Ira Forman, executive director of the National Jewish Democratic Council, said that the choice indicated that Obama would not listen to the "wrong people" regarding the U.S.–Israel relationship. Some commentators opined that Emanuel would be good for the Israeli–Palestinian peace process because if Israeli leaders made excuses for not dismantling settlements, Emanuel would be tough and pressure the Israelis to comply. Some Palestinians expressed dismay at Emanuel's appointment.

Weeks after accepting the appointment, Emanuel participated on a panel of corporate chief executive officers sponsored by the Wall Street Journal, and said, "You never want a serious crisis to go to waste." Emanuel explained later, "... what I said was, never allow a good crisis to go to waste when it's an opportunity to do things that you had never considered, or that you didn't think were possible."

In a 2009 article in The New York Times, Emanuel was characterized as being "perhaps the most influential chief of staff of a generation".

He has a reputation for his no-holds-barred negotiation style that involves "his share of shouting and cursing". Ezekiel Emanuel has written, "The impatient, pushy Emanuel style is so well known that during a recent job interview I was asked, point-blank, whether I had the level-headed temperament the position required. ... . [A]s obvious as our flaws are to others, it's difficult to recognize them in ourselves." At a January 2010 closed-door meeting in the White House with liberal activists, Emanuel called them "fucking retarded" for planning to run TV ads attacking conservative Democrats who didn't support Obama's health-care overhaul. After the remarks were quoted in a front-page story of the Wall Street Journal, and after he was criticized by Sarah Palin, Emanuel apologized to organizations for the mentally handicapped for using the word "retarded".

According to Jonathan Alter's book, The Promise, Emanuel opposed Barack Obama's plan for a broad health care reform, but Obama overrode him. Emanuel advocated a smaller plan because it could get bi-partisan support. Emanuel wanted to expand coverage for children, and increase the number of single mothers eligible for Medicaid. For that reason, it was dubbed "the Titanic plan", a reference to the priority given to saving women and children during the sinking of the Titanic. Reportedly, House Speaker Pelosi had to convince Obama on the health care initiative after Emanuel dramatically scaled it back. Emanuel has since apologized for his role, saying, "Thank God for the country, he didn't listen to me", after the Supreme Court upheld "ObamaCare" in 2012.

As chief of staff, Emanuel would make his staff laugh. During a staff meeting, when Chief Technology Officer Aneesh Chopra gave uniformly upbeat reports, Emanuel is said to have looked at him and said: "Whatever you're taking, I want some." Emanuel had a hand in war strategy, political maneuvering, communications and economic policy. Bob Woodward wrote in Obama's Wars that Emanuel made a habit of telephoning CIA Director Leon Panetta and asking about the lethal drone strikes aimed at Al Qaeda, asking, "Who did we get today?".

In 2010, Emanuel was reported to have conflicts with other senior members of the president's team and ideological clashes over policy. He was also the focal point of criticism from left-leaning Democrats for the administration's perceived move to the center. By September 2010, with the Democrats anticipating heavy losses in mid-term elections, this was said to precipitate Emanuel's departure as chief of staff.

Mayor of Chicago

Elections

2011

On September 30, 2010, it was announced that Emanuel would leave his post as White House Chief of Staff to run for Mayor of Chicago. He was replaced by Pete Rouse on October 2, 2010.

Emanuel entered the race with high-name recognition, having not only a sizeable local profile, but a sizable national profile.

Emanuel's eligibility for office was challenged on the basis of his lack of residency in Chicago for one year prior to the election. This was the period when Emanuel was in Washington serving as the White House chief of staff. The Board of Elections and the Cook County Circuit Court affirmed his eligibility. A divided Court of Appeals reversed the Circuit Court, holding on January 24, 2011, that residency for purposes of a candidate is different from residency for purposes of being a voter. A further appeal to the Illinois Supreme Court resulted in a unanimous decision reversing the Court of Appeals and affirming Emanuel's eligibility.

In the race, Emanuel had a financial advantage over the other candidates. He was by far the best-financed candidate, with more than three times the campaign funds as the second-best financed candidate (Gery Chico), and more than twenty-times the third-best financed candidate (Carol Moseley Braun). Emanuel's had his financial advantage from the very start of his candidacy, as he began his campaign with approximately $1.2 million from his congressional campaign fund. By December 31, 2010 he had raised more than $10.5 million in additional funds. On January 1, 2011 the Illinois Campaign Disclosure Act took effect, limiting individual personal contributions to candidates to $5,000. Nevertheless, he continued to raise substantial funds, ultimately having procured a total $15 million over the course of his campaign (including those funds transferred from his congressional campaign committee. Emanuel was able to raise so much because he had experience fundraising, had built a Washington connections and a national profile, and his brother Ari had Hollywood connections. He had 75 contributors give more than $50,000, twenty-five of which were from out of state. Among these high-dollar contributors were Steven Spielberg, Donald Trump, and Steve Jobs. Despite having a national fundraising operation, three-quarters of his donations came locally. More than $800,000 of his contributions were from financial exchange and trading executives, with his largest single donation being a $200,000 donation from executives of the Chicago Mercantile Exchange.

Emanuel proposed lowering the city's sales tax and raising the service tax. Emanuel supported negotiating with the Chicago Teachers Union for longer school days and school years. Emanuel opposed instituting an elected school board.  This received criticism from other candidates.

Other candidates assailed his tenure at Freddie Mac.

As the frontrunner, Emanuel had gotten more press coverage than other mayoral candidates. This was furthered by the fact that the challenge to his residency became a dominant headline.

Emanuel entered the race with solid backing from North and Northwest Side Democratic Ward Committeemen.

Emanuel's advertisements showed portrayed him as having strong roots in the city, and, in telling his biography, emphasized his upbringing on the North Shore. Contrarily, Emanuel's opponents attempted to characterize him as a carpetbagger, hailing not from the city itself but rather from the North Shore and Washington, D.C. Emanuel's advertisements also sought to emphasize his tenures in working in the White House and his tenure as a congressman. Emanuel would highlight his relations with presidents Clinton and Obama. He also sought to highlight the fact that he had forged connections in Washington during his time in congress, and also had strong business ties.

Emanuel had overwhelming support from Jewish and LGBT voters. Emanuel held a lead with independent progressives, including strong support from the lakefront liberals voting bloc of wealthy white progressives from the city's northern lakefront. As the only white candidate in the race, Emanuel was seen as likely to receive unified support from a majority of the white electorate. Since the hispanic vote was largely split between two hispanic candidates (Gery Chico and Miguel del Valle), once Emanuel was able to secure the support of the majority of the black vote, he had secured himself victory.

In attracting African American voters to his candidacy, Emanuel was helped by his associations with Presidents Clinton and Obama, both of whom were extremely popular among the African American community. After Moseley Braun's support began to crater following a character attack on fellow candidate Patricia Van Pelt Watkins which backfired, Emanuel was the beneficiary as the, largely African American, voters that abandoned their support of Moseley Braun's candidacy primarily migrated to support his candidacy. Once this happened, Emanuel had all but secured himself a first-place finish, and the remaining candidates were left to jockey for second-place in hopes of there being a runoff.

Emanuel carried the endorsements of both the city's major daily newspapers, the Chicago Tribune and the Chicago Sun-Times.

Emanuel's mayoral campaign was the inspiration for a satirical Twitter account called MayorEmanuel, which received more than 43,000 followers, more popular than Emanuel's actual Twitter account. Emanuel announced on February 28 that if the author would reveal himself, he would donate $5,000 to the charity of the author's choice. When Chicago journalist Dan Sinker revealed himself, Emanuel donated the money to Young Chicago Authors, a community organization which helps young people with writing and publishing skills.

Emanuel was elected on February 22, 2011, with 55% of the vote, and was sworn in as the 55th Mayor of Chicago on May 16, 2011, at the Pritzker Pavilion. At his inauguration were outgoing Mayor Richard M. Daley, Vice President Joe Biden, Labor Secretary Hilda Solis, Treasury Secretary Timothy Geithner, former Mayor Jane Byrne, and William M. Daley, brother of the outgoing mayor and who would later serve as White House Chief of Staff. Emanuel was Chicago's first Jewish mayor.

2015

In August 2014, Chicago Tribune poll reported Emanuel had a 35% approval rating as mayor of Chicago.

In 2015, Emanuel won 56 percent of the vote in the run-off election against Jesús "Chuy" García held on April 7, 2015. He had been hurt by sharp neighborhood criticism of his decision to shut down 50 public schools in black and Latino neighborhoods, and his installation of red light cameras, together with anger at the high level of gun violence on the streets. On the other hand, he was supported by the business community and most elements of the Democratic party.

2016
In February 2016, Chicago Tribune polls reported that Emanuel approval ratings had dropped to 27%, for his role as the Mayor of Chicago.

The Chicago Tribune explained that this all-time low job approval record occured after the public largely had disapproved of Emanuel's handling of the Laquan McDonald police shooting video, and the majority of the polled Chicagoans had felt that he was not justified in withholding the video from the public. The Guardian newspaper had reported of a "steady barrage of “Resign Rahm” protests since November" and in response, Emanuel forced the resignation of Chicago’s police chief, Garry McCarthy, as well as generating a plan that promised to reform the city’s police department.

2019

Emanuel announced in October 2017 that he was running for reelection in 2019, despite low approval ratings and some potentially serious challengers. In September 2018, Emanuel then announced he would not run for reelection as previously announced. Close friend David Axelrod told USA Today that Emanuel had grown uncertain about his devotion to a third term. Emanuel had been leading in the polls prior to his decision to withdraw. In an interview with the Chicago Tribune, Emanuel stated that he had been conferring with his wife and children for months before announcing the decision and that he felt it was time to "write the next chapter."

Tenure
Emanuel assembled a transition team from varied backgrounds. On November 16, the city council voted unanimously to adopt the mayor's first budget, which decreased the budget by $34 million and increased spending by $46.2 million, supported by increasing fees and fines. Despite most Aldermen opposing cuts to library workers and the closure of mental health clinics, they ultimately supported it, calling it "honest". At a news conference in November 2012, Emanuel listed his top three priorities for the state legislature as security and pension reform, adding a casino to Chicago, and equal marriage rights for same-sex couples. At a press conference with then Illinois Governor Pat Quinn, who previously vetoed legislation to put a casino in Chicago, the two were "very close" to reaching a deal.

In April 2018, Emanuel received an honorary Doctor of Laws degree from NUI Galway, a university in Chicago's sister city of Galway, Ireland, with the conferrers citing achievements in education reform while Mayor.

During Emanuel's time as mayor of Chicago, two of Emanuel's appointees, Barbara Byrd-Bennett and Amer Ahmad, were convicted of corruption charges. A third appointee, Forrest Claypool, resigned after the inspector general accused him of a cover up. Emanuel received backlash for defending him against the accusations.

Aldermanic appointments
As mayor, Emanuel appointed several individuals to fill vacancies on the Chicago City Council. This included appointing Natashia Holmes as 7th Ward alderman in 2013, Deb Mell as 33rd Ward alderman in 2013, Sophia King as 4th ward alderman in 2016, and Silvana Tabares as 23rd Ward alderman in 2018.

Following the resignation of Willie Cochran in March 2019, Emanuel had the opportunity to make a final aldermanic appointment, appointing an interim alderman to hold the seat until his successor (to be elected in an April 2 runoff) would assume office on May 20. However, Emanuel did not make such an appointment, leaving the seat vacant until March 20.

Police and community relations
In August 2012, a federal lawsuit was filed by eleven Chicago police officers alleging they were removed from the mayoral security detail and replaced with officers who worked on Emanuel's mayoral campaign, in violation of the 1983 Shakman Decree, which bars city officials from making political considerations in the hiring process.

Rahm Emanuel faced a great deal of criticism for his handling of the October 20, 2014, police murder of Laquan McDonald. The dash-cam video of the shooting was initially withheld, and only was released after a judge ordered it on November 24, 2015. After the video release, Emanuel was condemned for covering up the incident and allowing Chicago police to use excessive force against minorities. Chicago Tribune columnist John Kass wrote that the Emanuel administration withheld from the public the police dashboard camera video of the shooting in order to secure the reelection. Emanuel responded to criticism of the shooting and how it was handled by firing police Superintendent Garry McCarthy. In early December, the federal Justice Department announced an investigation into the Chicago Police Department, a move which Emanuel initially called "misguided". Illinois state legislator La Shawn Ford also introduced a bill to recall the mayor (an effort most pundits claim was more symbolic than practical).

Protests erupted soon after the release of the video, and on Black Friday protesters shut down part of the city's Magnificent Mile. Public calls for resignation grew steadily over this period, including a well-circulated op-ed published in The New York Times. By early December, Emanuel's approval rating had sunk to 18%, with 67% of Chicagoans disapproving of his job performance, and slightly more than half of those polled calling for his resignation. During the week of December 10, protestors blocked streets and continued to call for Emanuel to resign. Additional protests against Emanuel and Chicago's Police Department were held on the city's busy Michigan Avenue shopping area on December 24, 2015.

On December 26, 2015, a police officer killed two people in another shooting, including a woman whom the officer had shot by mistake. On December 28, Emanuel announced that he was cutting short his vacation in Cuba to deal with the crisis. Emanuel announced several changes to the Chicago police department on December 30, including doubling the number of Tasers issued to officers. On New Year's Eve, the Emanuel administration released e-mails revealing they had sought to coordinate with independent agencies such as the Independent Police Review Authority regarding public relations after the shooting. The same day The New Yorker added to the wave of negative media attention surrounding the mayor by publishing "The Sudden But Well-Deserved Fall of Rahm Emanuel", an article critically reevaluating Emanuel's legacy as a political operative since the early 1990s.

Public education
In 2012, during the contract negotiations between the city and the Chicago Teachers Union (CTU), compromise could not be reached over issues like health insurance increases, teacher evaluations, and seniority pay increases. On August 8, 2012, the CTU voted 90% to authorize a strike. On September 10, the CTU began a strike after CTU President Lewis declared that negotiations with the city were not succeeding. On September 14, the CTU reached a tentative agreement with the city which included preferences for teachers who have been laid off due to a school closing to be hired in another school and student test scores having less of a role in teacher evaluations than the city had originally planned. This tentative agreement did not hold, and the strike continued, after which Emanuel announced his intention to seek a legal injunction, forcing teachers back to work. On September 17, Emanuel's efforts to end the strike stalled as the walkout went into the second week. Delegates from the CTU voted to end the strike on September 18, 2012, and students began their return to the schools the following day.

On September 17, 2013, Emanuel's appointed Chicago Board of Education announced the closing of 50 Chicago public schools, 49 elementary schools and a high school — the largest school closure in Chicago history.

The trends in dropout and graduation rates have shown considerable improvement in the last five years, but researchers point out the alternative school performance does not follow the general trend.

Public health
On August 16, 2011, Emanuel unveiled "Healthy Chicago", the city's first  public health blueprint with Chicago Department of Public Health Commissioner Bechara Choucair. Emanuel initiated the consolidation of City Council committees from 19 to 16 in a cost control effort. On October 30, 2012, Emanuel voiced his support for the demolition of the abandoned Prentice Women's Hospital Building, in order for Northwestern University, which owns the property, to build a new facility. Preservationists supported historical landmark status. Days later, the Commission on Chicago Landmarks voted that the building met landmark status criteria then reversed their decision later in the same meeting. On November 15, a judge granted a temporary stay of the decision in order for a lawsuit filed by preservation coalitions against the landmark commission to be heard.

Lack of transparency 
Emanuel rejected requests under the Illinois Freedom of Information Act from The Chicago Tribune for various communication and information logs for himself and his staff, labelling it "unduly burdensome". After a second request by the Tribune, they were informed that 90 percent of the e-mails had been deleted by Emanuel and his top aides. As a result, Emanuel came under fire for going against his campaign promise to create "the most open, accountable, and transparent government that the City of Chicago has ever seen".

Emanuel and his office were found guilty of breaking state law by withholding government emails by transferring them onto his personal phone.

In March 2017 Chicago Tribune reported Emanuel released 2,696 emails he had previously withheld. In the emails there were found to be 26 possible violations of lobbying laws. On at least 26 occasions lobbyists, corporate executives, donors, and friends of Emanuel got access to Emanuel or other city officials without registering as a lobbyist or reporting their contact to the ethics board.

Tax-exempt status of Lollapalooza
Lollapalooza, an annual summer music festival in Grant Park, was exempt from taxation. Emanuel's brother Ari is the co-CEO of William Morris Endeavor, which co-owns the event. In 2011 Rahm Emanuel asked the City Council to appoint an independent third party negotiator, to avoid having the negotiation seen as biased. Although the deal was reached before Emanuel took office, tax breaks must be negotiated every year. It was later revealed that the festival received its tax exemption for 2011 in the final days of the Daley administration. In 2012, Lollapalooza paid taxes for the first time in seven years and extended its contract to host in Grant Park through 2021.

Hyperloop
Rahm Emanuel announced preliminary plans to award Elon Musk a contract to build a Hyperloop between downtown Chicago and the city’s O'Hare International Airport, although it would receive no public subsidies under this plan. However, some criticized the fact that Elon Musk has in the past donated more than $55,000 to Rahm Emanuel’s various election campaigns, suggesting a potential conflict of interest between the two.

Immigration
Chicago became a "de jure" sanctuary city in 2012 when Rahm Emanuel and the City Council passed the Welcoming City Ordinance.

Approval ratings

End of tenure
Emanuel planned to arrange for a smooth transition between his mayoral administration and that of his elected successor Lori Lightfoot. Reports were that he intended to model the transition between their administrations upon the U.S. presidential transition between the George W. Bush and Barack Obama administrations. Emanuel had been part of that transition as Obama's Chief of Staff designate.

Post-mayoral career 
Hours after Emanuel left office, the magazine  The Atlantic, where he had written a dozen essays in prior months, made him a contributing editor; however, this honorary title was withdrawn after black staff members objected. In May 2019, he was named founding executive chair of the National BAM Advisory Council of the Becoming A Man youth program. In June 2019, Emanuel joined Centerview Partners as a senior counselor. Since July 2019, Emanuel has also served as a political analyst for ABC News.

Potential Cabinet position in Biden administration 

Progressive politicians nationally, including Alexandria Ocasio-Cortez and Matt Martin, have opposed his potential inclusion in Joe Biden's Cabinet, citing his handling of the murder of Laquan McDonald. Initially, Emanuel was considered for Transportation secretary in the Biden administration.

United States Ambassador to Japan

It was reported in February 2021 that Emanuel was being considered by the Biden administration as an ambassador to either China or Japan. In April 2021 it was reported that Biden had chosen him as ambassador to Japan; Emanuel was formally nominated to serve as ambassador in August 2021. Hearings were held on Emanuel's nomination in the Senate Foreign Relations Committee on October 20, 2021. The committee favorably reported Emanuel's nomination to the Senate floor on November 3, 2021. On December 18, 2021, United States Senate confirmed Emanuel's nomination in a 48–21 vote; senators Ed Markey, Jeff Merkley and Elizabeth Warren were the only Democrats to vote against his confirmation. He presented his credentials to Japanese Emperor Naruhito on March 25, 2022.

Electoral history 
Mayor of Chicago

US House of Representatives

|-
| colspan=10 |
|-
!Year
!Winning candidate
!Party
!Pct
!Opponent
!Party
!Pct
!Opponent
!Party
!Pct
|-
|2002
| |Rahm Emanuel
| |Democratic
| |67%
| |Mark Augusti
| |Republican
| |29%
| |Frank Gonzalez
| |Libertarian
| |4%
|-
|2004
| |Rahm Emanuel (inc.)
| |Democratic
| |76%
| |Bruce Best
| |Republican
| |24%
|
|
|-
|2006
| |Rahm Emanuel (inc.)
| |Democratic
| |78%
| |Kevin White
| |Republican
| |22%
|
|
|
|-
|2008
| |Rahm Emanuel (inc.)
| |Democratic
| |74%
| |Tom Hanson
| |Republican
| |22%
| |Alan Augustson
| |Green
| |4%

Personal life
Emanuel and his wife, Amy Merritt Rule, have a son and two daughters. The family lives in the Ravenswood neighborhood on Chicago's north side. Rule converted to Judaism shortly before their wedding. Emanuel is a close friend of fellow Chicagoan David Axelrod, chief strategist for Obama's 2008 and 2012 presidential campaign, and Axelrod signed the ketuba, the Jewish marriage contract, at Emanuel's wedding. The Emanuels are members of the Chicago synagogue Anshe Sholom B'nai Israel. Rabbi Asher Lopatin of the congregation described Emanuel's family as "a very involved Jewish family", adding that "Amy was one of the teachers for a class for children during the High Holidays two years ago". Emanuel has said of his Judaism: "I am proud of my heritage and treasure the values it has taught me." Emanuel's children attended the private University of Chicago Laboratory Schools in the Hyde Park neighborhood on Chicago's south side.

Each year during the winter holidays, Emanuel takes a family trip on which his children can be exposed to other cultures and parts of the world. Prior family trips have been to Vietnam, India, Kenya, Zambia, and South America. His 2015 holiday trip was scheduled for the island of Cuba.

Emanuel trains for and participates in triathlons. In 2011, he scored 9th out of 80 competitors in his age group. A passionate cyclist, he rides a custom-built, state-of-the-art Parlee road bike.

Works

See also
 History of the Jews in Chicago
 List of Jewish members of the United States Congress

Notes

References

Further reading

Biography
 

Articles
 
 
 
  Twenty minute interview.
 
 
 In April 2011, the VOA Special English service of the Voice of America broadcast a 15-minute program on Rahm Emanuel. A transcript and MP3 of the program, intended for English learners, can be found at Rahm Emanuel Gets Ready for New Job as Mayor of Chicago.

External links

 
 
 Rahm Emanuel  archive at the Chicago Reader
 Rahm Emanuel news, photos and video at the Chicago Tribune
 

|-

|-

|-

|-

|-

|-

|-

|-

|-

 
1959 births
Living people
21st-century American diplomats
21st-century American politicians
Ambassadors of the United States to Japan
American amputees
American businesspeople
American gun control activists
American male ballet dancers
American Orthodox Jews
American people of Israeli descent
American people of Moldovan-Jewish descent
Articles containing video clips
Clinton administration personnel
Democratic Party members of the United States House of Representatives from Illinois
Senior Advisors to the President of the United States
Goldman Sachs people
Jewish mayors of places in the United States
Jewish members of the United States House of Representatives
Jewish American members of the Cabinet of the United States
Jewish American people in Illinois politics
Jews and Judaism in Chicago
Mayors of Chicago
New Trier High School alumni
Northwestern University School of Communication alumni
Obama administration cabinet members
Sarah Lawrence College alumni
White House Chiefs of Staff